Blood in Dispute (Sangkream Bangobaaun  War Brothers) is a 2015 Philippines-Cambodian film directed by Canadian director Ken Simpson and stars Filipino actors Andrea Torres and Mikael Daez and Cambodian actors Meas Thorn Srenai, Khat Vaihang, and Tep Rindaro. The film was released as Fight for Love in the Philippines.

The film was made in collaboration of the Cambodian Television Network (CTN) and GMA Network of the Philippines.

Synopsis
25 years after fleeing Cambodia for the Philippines, Mr. Sokun (Tep Rindaro) discovers a letter that compels him to return. As Mr. Sokun uncovers the details of a family secret from his youth, he realizes it has huge ramifications for his muay thai fighting son, Marco (Mikael Daez) and his bokator trained counterpart Sokeat (Khat Vaihang). With their lives in danger, Mr. Sokun must enlist the help of Marco's beleaguered girlfriend Angela (Andrea Torres) and Sokeat's childhood friend Sonita (Meas Thorn Srenai) to stop the two rivals from fighting.

Cast
 Tep Rindaro as Mr. Sokun
 Mikael Daez as Marco
 Khat Vaihang as Sokeat
 Andrea Torres as Angela
 Meas Thorn Srenai as Sonita

Production
Production of the film took three years to complete.

Release
The film was released on August 9, 2015 in all major theaters in Phnom Penh and Siem Reap, Cambodia. The film was shown in Cambodian theaters for two weeks before it is shown during a special TV release to the Cambodian public on CTN.

However, the film was not released in Philippine theaters, but instead, it was shown on GMA Network via the network's Sunday Night Box Office movie block. The movie was split into two parts, with the first part shown on April 17, 2016, and the second part on April 24, 2016.

References

Philippine multilingual films
2015 multilingual films
Cambodian multilingual films